"R U Crazy" a single by English singer-songwriter, Conor Maynard. It was released on 4 October 2013. The song was written by Maynard, Eagle Eye, and Labrinth, who also produced the song. Labrinth also provided a remix of the song, which premiered on the BBC Radio 1 Review Show on 17 September 2013.

Background
It was revealed on 22 August 2013, by Maynard via YouTube that his next single is called "R U Crazy" The song was premiered on radio on 26 August, with the accompanying music video being released later that day. Maynard has said that he's "grown up a bit since the first album" and that "the music is going to be slightly different." The music video is for an older viewer compared to his past videos.

Track listings

Chart performance

Weekly charts

Year-end charts

Release history

References

2013 singles
2013 songs
Conor Maynard songs
Parlophone singles
Song recordings produced by Labrinth
Songs written by Labrinth